The Crimson Runner is a 1925 American silent drama film directed by Tom Forman and starring Priscilla Dean, Bernard Siegel, and Alan Hale.

Plot

As described in a film magazine review, Bianca Schreber is a poor girl whose father was wounded while in the Austrian Army during World War I. She is obliged to steal to keep from starving. With many poor people in want in her town, she is brought to the decision to become an outlaw for the purpose of feeding the hungry. Police pursue her until she takes refuge in the home of a noble with whom she is in love. Gregory, who has faked a title and grafted to obtain his government position, discovers Bianca in his home but she escapes. When Gregory holds a masquerade ball, she hides behind a mask and wins his ardor. Infatuated with her, he takes her to his chamber and attacks her. The guests break down the door to find them struggling. Gregory leaps to his death from a window. The noble replaces Gregory in his position and obtains a pardon for the young woman, whom he marries.

Cast

Preservation

A complete copy of The Crimson Runner is located in the collection of Lobster Films in Paris.

References

Bibliography
 Wlaschin, Ken (2009). Silent Mystery and Detective Movies: A Comprehensive Filmography. McFarland.

External links

1925 films
1925 drama films
1920s English-language films
American silent feature films
Silent American drama films
Films directed by Tom Forman
American black-and-white films
Producers Distributing Corporation films
Films set in Vienna
1920s American films